Well-Tempered Clavicle is the 35th book of the Xanth series by Piers Anthony.  The title is a pun on the Bach musical work The Well-Tempered Clavier.

The back cover of the book states the following:

"When a walking skeleton named Picka Bones happens upon a trio of melodic pets and a lovely, lovelorn princess, his dull and passionless existence is suddenly filled with danger, excitement, and the temptations of the flesh. For a plague of appalling puns has been unleashed on Xanth, and only Picka's musical gifts have the power to save the enchanted realm from the dire monster who imperils it."

External links
 Well-Tempered Clavicle on Tor Books

 34
2010 American novels
Tor Books books